Nullsoft, Inc. was an American software house founded in Sedona, Arizona, in 1997 by Justin Frankel. Its products included the Winamp media player and the SHOUTcast MP3 streaming media server. In later years, their open source installer system, the Nullsoft Scriptable Install System (NSIS) became an alternative to commercial products like InstallShield. The company's name is a parody of Microsoft. Mike the Llama is the company's mascot; this is frequently referred to in promotional material (especially for Winamp) citing llamas. Frankel introduced the llama in Winamp's startup sound clip, inspired by the lyrics of Wesley Willis: "Winamp, it really whips the llama's ass!"

Nullsoft was sold to AOL (formerly known as America Online) on June 1, 1999, and thereafter existed as a subsidiary of the company. After the acquisition, Nullsoft headquarters were moved to San Francisco, California. Their later developments included the Nullsoft Streaming Video (NSV) format, which was intended to stream media that used any audio or video codec. In 2002, the press reported a technology called Ultravox being developed by Nullsoft. Nullsoft created the peer-to-peer networks Gnutella and WASTE. Although AOL tried to limit the distribution of Gnutella and WASTE, the Ultravox technology was reportedly used for some AOL radio services in 2003. A service called Nullsoft Television was announced in 2003 using NSV.

Nullsoft released several new versions of the Winamp player and grew its monthly unique subscriber base from 33 million users to over 52 million users by 2005. Nullsoft's San Francisco offices were closed in December 2003, with a near-concurrent departure of Frankel and the original Winamp development team. Nullsoft then became a division of AOL Music. In 2013, some AOL Music sites were shut down and others sold to Townsquare Media.

In November 2013, an unofficial report surfaced that Microsoft was in talks with AOL to acquire Nullsoft. On January 14, 2014, it was officially announced that Belgian online radio aggregator Radionomy had bought Winamp and Shoutcast, formerly owned by Nullsoft. No financial details were publicly announced.

References

External links
 Winamp

Companies disestablished in 2013
Companies established in 1997
Defunct software companies of the United States
Former Time Warner subsidiaries
Radionomy